Serguey Torres Madrigal (born 20 January 1987) is a Cuban sprint canoeist who mostly competes in flatwater canoe doubles (C-2). He won four medals at the ICF Canoe Sprint World Championships with two silvers (C-2 1000 m: 2005 and 2007) and two bronzes (C-2 200 m and C-2 500 m, both in 2007). He placed ninth, sixth and sixth in the C-2 1000 m event at the 2008, 2012 and 2016 Olympics, respectively. He also competed in the Tokyo 2020 Olympic Games and won a gold medal in the Men's C-2 1000 metres event.

Torres has a degree in physical education from the Superior Institute of Physical Culture Manuel Fajardo in Havana. He is married and has one daughter.

References

External links

1987 births
Canoeists at the 2007 Pan American Games
Canoeists at the 2008 Summer Olympics
Canoeists at the 2011 Pan American Games
Canoeists at the 2012 Summer Olympics
Canoeists at the 2016 Summer Olympics
Cuban male canoeists
Living people
Olympic canoeists of Cuba
ICF Canoe Sprint World Championships medalists in Canadian
Pan American Games medalists in canoeing
Pan American Games bronze medalists for Cuba
Canoeists at the 2015 Pan American Games
People from Sancti Spíritus
Central American and Caribbean Games gold medalists for Cuba
Competitors at the 2014 Central American and Caribbean Games
Canoeists at the 2019 Pan American Games
Central American and Caribbean Games medalists in canoeing
Medalists at the 2007 Pan American Games
Medalists at the 2011 Pan American Games
Medalists at the 2015 Pan American Games
Medalists at the 2019 Pan American Games
Canoeists at the 2020 Summer Olympics
Medalists at the 2020 Summer Olympics
Olympic medalists in canoeing
Olympic gold medalists for Cuba